Leiocephalus varius, commonly known as the Cayman curlytail or Cayman curly-tailed lizard, is a species of lizard in the family Leiocephalidae (curly-tailed lizard). It is native to the Cayman Islands.

References

varius
Reptiles described in 1887
Taxa named by Samuel Garman